Dick's Picks Volume 32 is a two-CD live album by the rock band the Grateful Dead.  It was recorded on August 7, 1982 at the Alpine Valley Music Theatre in East Troy, Wisconsin.  It was released on July 20, 2004.

Alpine Valley, an outdoor theater in the rural, southeastern part of the state, was well known among Deadheads of the era. 1982 was the first year that the band played multiple days at the venue.  It is also the site of the Grateful Dead concert video Downhill From Here.

Critical reception

On AllMusic Lindsay Planer said, "By some accounts, early-'80 shows could often be accurately classified as hit-or-miss affairs; on this evening the Grateful Dead are particularly inspired throughout....  Even though this volume was mastered from a cassette tape, the powerful performance far outweighs any audible sonic anomalies."

In The Music Box John Metzger wrote, "...the two-disc collection offers a time capsule of sorts to the group's most avid fans... For them, the notion that it also features some rather explosive music, particularly during its latter half, is reward enough for enduring a few of the bumpier moments contained within the show."

Enclosure and review

The release includes two sheets of paper stapled together in the middle, yielding an eight-page enclosure that slides out of the case, allowing the front of it to serve as the cover of the CD.  The back is a mirror image of the cover's background.

The first two pages feature a large black-and-white photograph of the band playing on stage.  The left side of the middle two pages features a short newspaper clipping of a review of the show, and the right side features a color photograph taken in daylight of the crowd at the show with the band playing on stage in the background.  The next-to-last page shows a similar scene that reveals less of the crowd and more of the woods behind the stage, and the last page lists the contents of and credits for the release.

Review

The newspaper clipping contains a short review from the Milwaukee Journal Sentinel.  It was written by Divina Infusino, is dated August 8, 1982, and entitled "Grateful Dead re-enact ritual for 20,000 fans."

True to its title, the article describes the scene as reminiscent of prior shows performed by the "17-year-old" band who "represent more innocent times, when spontaneity replaced structure as a guideline".  Infusino expresses her mixed feelings about the result, writing that "the Dead let its sound take its course and unfold at will" resulting in "a three-hour show that was sometimes delightful and in other parts laborious."

Divina closes her piece by observing that "The audience never minded the dull moments, nor did it object that the band refrained from performing its best known numbers, like 'Sugar Magnolia' and 'Truckin'.' "

Caveat emptor
Each volume of Dick's Picks has its own "caveat emptor" label, advising the listener of the sound quality of the recording.  The one for volume 32 reads:

Track listing
Disc One
First set:
 "The Music Never Stopped" > (Bob Weir, John Barlow) – 4:19
 "Sugaree" > (Jerry Garcia, Robert Hunter) – 9:51
 "The Music Never Stopped" reprise (Weir, Barlow) – 4:00
 "Me and My Uncle" > (John Phillips) – 3:02
 "Big River" (Johnny Cash) – 6:12
 "It Must Have Been the Roses" (Hunter) – 5:51
 "C.C. Rider" (traditional, arranged by the Grateful Dead) – 7:34
 "Ramble On Rose" (Garcia, Hunter) – 7:31
 "Beat It On Down the Line" > (Jesse Fuller) – 3:11
 "On the Road Again" (traditional, arranged by the Grateful Dead) – 3:04
 "Althea" (Garcia, Hunter) – 7:56
 "Let It Grow" (Weir, Barlow) – 11:39
Encore:
"U.S. Blues" (Garcia, Hunter) – 5:16
Disc Two
Second set:
 "China Cat Sunflower" (Garcia, Hunter) – 6:42
 "I Know You Rider" (traditional, arranged by the Grateful Dead) – 7:43
 "Man Smart, Woman Smarter" (Span) – 8:29
 "Ship of Fools" (Garcia, Hunter) – 6:39
 "Playing in the Band" > (Weir, Mickey Hart, Hunter) – 11:15
 "Drums" > (Hart, Bill Kreutzmann) – 5:31
 "Space" > (Garcia, Phil Lesh, Weir) – 5:31
 "The Wheel" > (Garcia, Kreutzmann, Hunter) – 5:51
 "Playing in the Band" > reprise (Weir, Mickey Hart, Hunter) – 4:09
 "Morning Dew" > (Bonnie Dobson, Tim Rose) – 10:11
 "One More Saturday Night" (Weir) – 4:59
Notes

Personnel

Grateful Dead
 Jerry Garcia – lead guitar, vocals
 Mickey Hart – drums
 Bill Kreutzmann – drums
 Phil Lesh – electric bass
 Brent Mydland – keyboards, vocals
 Bob Weir – rhythm guitar, vocals

Production
Dan Healy –  recording
Jeffrey Norman –  cd mastering
David Lemieux –  tape archivist
Eileen Law –  archival research
Robert Minkin –  photography, cover art and package design
Bill Turley –  photography

References

32
2004 live albums